Highland Lakes (mistakenly referred to as Highland Lake by the United States Census Bureau since the 1990 Census) is an unincorporated community and census-designated place (CDP) located within Vernon Township, in Sussex County, New Jersey, United States. As of the 2010 United States Census, the CDP's population was 4,933. Highland Lakes has its own Post Office with the ZIP code 07422.

Geography
According to the United States Census Bureau, the CDP had a total area of 6.099 square miles (15.797 km2), including 5.071 square miles (13.134 km2) of land and 1.028 square miles (2.663 km2) of water (16.86%).

Demographics

Census 2010

Census 2000
As of the 2000 United States Census there were 5,051 people, 1,794 households, and 1,375 families residing in the CDP. The population density was 386.9/km2 (1,001.8/mi2). There were 2,283 housing units at an average density of 174.9/km2 (452.8/mi2). The racial makeup of the CDP was 94.88% White, 2.09% African American, 0.08% Native American, 0.48% Asian, 1.23% from other races, and 1.05% from two or more races. Hispanic or Latino of any race were 5.53% of the population.

There were 1,794 households, out of which 42.8% had children under the age of 18 living with them, 65.7% were married couples living together, 7.9% had a female householder with no husband present, and 23.3% were non-families. 18.1% of all households were made up of individuals, and 5.0% had someone living alone who was 65 years of age or older. The average household size was 2.82 and the average family size was 3.24.

In the CDP the population was spread out, with 29.4% under the age of 18, 6.2% from 18 to 24, 34.3% from 25 to 44, 22.0% from 45 to 64, and 8.1% who were 65 years of age or older. The median age was 36 years. For every 100 females, there were 99.9 males. For every 100 females age 18 and over, there were 97.9 males.

The median income for a household in the CDP was $77,968, and the median income for a family was $87,313. Males had a median income of $58,395 versus $39,968 for females. The per capita income for the CDP was $27,445. About 2.6% of families and 3.5% of the population were below the poverty line, including 4.4% of those under age 18 and 3.3% of those age 65 or over.

Location and surroundings
Located in northern New Jersey's Sussex County, Highland Lakes is a private lake community that focuses on outdoor activities. The area, once rolling dairy farm hillsides, was developed in the 1930s as a summer retreat for families in the New York City Metropolitan area. Most of the homes are lake-style or log cabins, retaining most of the architecture of the original community. Many of what were once summer homes, are now the full-time residences of homeowners in Highland Lakes.  Highland Lakes is made up of five lakes (Highland Lake, East Highland Lake, Upper Highland Lake, Upper West Highland Lake, and Lake Wanda) that between them have seven beaches. Highland Lakes is governed by a private association that manages all property and access to recreational facilities, which include the lakes, beaches, playgrounds, tennis and basketball courts and clubhouse. All property owners pay an initiation fee and annual dues to the Highland Lakes Country Club and Community Association. Highland Lakes is located adjacent to the 34,350-acre  Wawayanda State Park and near the Pequannock Watershed, which is a large parcel owned by the City of Newark in Essex County for their water supply.

Notable people

People who were born in, residents of, or otherwise closely associated with Highland Lakes include:
 Nicolas de Gunzburg
 Ryan Izzo (born 1995), tight end for the Seattle Seahawks.

References

External links

 The Advertiser News, community newspaper

Census-designated places in Sussex County, New Jersey
Vernon Township, New Jersey